The Lost Strait is a 2018 Iranian war drama film written and directed by Bahram Tavakoli. The film screened for the first time at the 36th Fajr Film Festival and received 5 Awards and 6 nominations.

Cast 
Amir Jadidi as Hassan
Javad Ezzati as Majid
Hamid Reza Azarang as Khalil
Mahdi Pakdel as Reza
Ali Soleimani as Aziz
Mehdi Ghorbani as Ali
Yadollah Shadmani as Habib
Ghorban Najafi
Banipal Shoomoon
Milad Yazdani
Mehdi Sabaghi

Reception

Awards and nominations

References

External links 
 

2018 films
Iranian war films
Iran–Iraq War films
2010s Persian-language films
Crystal Simorgh for Best Film winners